Absolutism, in aesthetics, a term applied to the theory that beauty is an objective attribute of things, not merely a subjective feeling of pleasure in the one who perceives. It follows that there is an absolute standard of the beautiful by which all objects can be judged. The fact that, in practice, the judgments even of connoisseurs are perpetually at variance, and that the so-called criteria of one place or period are more or less opposed to those of all others, is explained by the hypothesis that individuals are differently gifted in respect of the capacity to appreciate.

See also
 Aesthetic relativism

References

Theories of aesthetics